The Slovenský Zväz Rádioamatérov (SZR) (in English, Slovak Amateur Radio Association) is a national non-profit organization for amateur radio enthusiasts in Slovakia. Key membership benefits of the SZR include the sponsorship of amateur radio operating awards, radio contests, and a QSL bureau for members who regularly communicate with amateur radio operators in other countries.  SZR represents the interests of Slovakian amateur radio operators before Slovak Republic and international telecommunications regulatory authorities.  SZR also supports local competitions in Amateur Radio Direction Finding as well as a national team that travels to regional and world championship events.  SZR publishes a membership magazine called Rádiožurnál SZR. SZR is the national member society representing the Slovak Republic in the International Amateur Radio Union.

References 

Slovakia
Organisations based in Slovakia
Organizations established in 1990
1990 establishments in Slovakia
Organisations based in Bratislava
Radio in Slovakia